Each team's roster consisted of at least 15 skaters (forwards and defencemen) and two goaltenders, and at most 22 skaters and three goaltenders. All 16 participating nations, through the confirmation of their respective national associations, had to submit a roster by the first IIHF directorate meeting.

Age and team as of 4 May 2018.

Group A

Austria
A 29-player roster was announced on 24 April 2018. It was reduced to 27 on 30 April 2018.

Head coach: Roger Bader

Belarus
Head coach: Dave Lewis was the acting head coach until 8 May 2018, after that Sergei Pushkov took over.

Czech Republic
A 32-player roster was announced on 26 April 2018. It was down to 26 on 29 April 2018.

Head coach: Josef Jandač

France
A 26-player roster was announced on 28 April 2018.

Head coach: Dave Henderson

Russia
A 28-player roster was announced on 24 April 2018. It was cut to 25 players on 1 May 2018.

Head coach: Ilya Vorobiev

Slovakia
A 27-player roster was announced on 26 April 2018. It was 25 players on 29 April 2018.

Head coach: Craig Ramsay

Sweden
A 25-player roster was announced on 29 April 2018. Filip Forsberg and Mattias Ekholm were added on May 14.

Head coach: Rikard Grönborg

Switzerland
A 26-player roster was announced on 28 April 2018.

Head coach: Patrick Fischer

Group B

Canada
An 18-player roster was announced on 12 April 2018, while four more players were added on 27 April 2018. Tyson Jost joined the team on 30 April 2018. Marc-Édouard Vlasic was added to the team 9 May 2018. Kyle Turris was added on 15 May 2018.

Head coach: Bill Peters

Denmark
A 26-player roster was announced on 30 April 2018. On 2 May, it was announced that Oliver Bjorkstrand would join the team.

Head coach: Janne Karlsson

Finland
A 25-player roster was announced on 30 April 2018.

Head coach: Lauri Marjamäki

Germany
A 25-player roster was announced on 30 April 2018. On 1 May 2018, Mirko Höfflin replaced Marcel Müller due to an injury.

Head coach: Marco Sturm

Latvia
A 25-player roster was announced on 18 April 2018.

Head coach: Bob Hartley

Norway
A 27-player roster was announced on 27 April 2018. It was down to 24 players on 30 April 2018.

Head coach: Petter Thoresen

South Korea
Head coach: Jim Paek

United States
A 23-player roster was announced on 28 April 2018.

Head coach: Jeff Blashill

References

Rosters
IIHF World Championship rosters